The Dogdyke Engine is a drainage engine near Tattershall, Lincolnshire, in England.

The building dates to 1856 when a rotative beam engine was built to replace windmill style engines possibly dating to 1540 and draining land between the rivers Bain and Witham. The engine discharged into the River Witham, but has a long fetch from a drain parallel to the river called The Dogdyke engine drain originating just south of Kirkstead at a place called Parkbeck.

1856 is relatively late and Wheeler does say that the 1856 engine replaces one installed in 1841, but the location of that is unknown.

The building is a grade II listed ancient monument.

Engines
 Bradley and Craven Beam engine and scoop wheel, built 1856
 Ruston & Hornsby Diesel engine and centrifugal pump, built 1940
 Ruston & Hornsby auxiliary engine.

Steam engine

The steam engine is maintained by a preservation trust, and steamed on weekends throughout the summer.  Although the Pinchbeck Engine is older, it can no longer be steamed.  The preservation trust claim this is the oldest working steam drainage engine.

The engine built by Bradley & Craven Ltd of Wakefield has a  flywheel, and a cylinder of  diameter and  stroke.   The construction is similar to an 'A' frame, but the decorative form of the cast iron upright obscures that basic shape and might be considered unique.

The first boiler, which lasted until 1909, was a twin tube Cornish type, working at 12psi.  The replacement was a Lancashire boiler made by Fosters of Lincoln, delivering 15psi.  Although the structure of this boiler survives, its rear end has been removed to make room for a modern vertical boiler which is used for the demonstration steamings.

The original  Chimney was struck by lightning in 1922 and reduced somewhat.  It was felled in 1941 after the conversion to diesel operation.

Diesel engines

The two diesel engines are maintained by The Witham Third District Internal Drainage Board as a standby for the nearby electric pumping station.  They are usually operated when the museum is open.

The steam engine was replaced in 1940 by a Ruston & Hornsby 7XHR diesel engine, serial number 194833, driving a 22 inch Gwynnes centrifugal pump. This engine has a capacity of 23.6 litre. The 7XHR design has a single horizontal cylinder of  bore,  stroke, and develops  at 300rpm.

There is also a Ruston & Hornsby 1VTO auxiliary engine, used to provide the starting air for the larger engine and to operate a small priming pump for the Gwynnes Limited pump. The 1VTO design has a single horizontal cylinder of  bore,  stroke, and develops  at 1000rpm.

Public access
Access to the site on steaming days involves driving down an unmade road and walking across a grassed area. Although essentially on one level, disabled access is limited because of the historic nature of the site.

Toilets, teas and limited wheelchair access are offered.

See also
 Prickwillow Museum
 Pinchbeck Engine
 Stretham Old Engine

References

External links

 Dogdyke Steam Drainage Station - official site
 limited Tourist information summary
 The diesel engine house
 The Witham 3rd IDB.

Video
 The Dogdyke engine in steam
 Scoopwheel in motion

Museums in Lincolnshire
Preserved beam engines
Grade II listed buildings in Lincolnshire
Scheduled monuments in Lincolnshire
Steam museums in England
Infrastructure completed in 1856